The New South Wales Office of the Director of Public Prosecutions (ODPP) is an independent prosecuting service and government agency within the portfolio of the Attorney General of New South Wales. Of all prosecuting services in Australia, the ODPP has the largest caseload, staff, and budget.

The current Director of Public Prosecutions is Sally Dowling .

History
The ODPP was established by the Director of Public Prosecutions Act 1986 (NSW) and began its operations on 13 July 1987.

Directors

Deputy Directors

Function
In general, it is for the prosecution, not the courts, to decide who is prosecuted and for what offences. It is the prosecution's sole discretion to shape its charges, and as a result, to influence what may follow in the trial.
The functions of the Director of Public Prosecutions, per the Director of Public Prosecutions Act 1986 (NSW) (i.e., the DPP Act), include:
prosecution of all committal proceedings and some summary proceedings before the Local Courts;
prosecution of indictable offences in the District and Supreme Courts;
conduct of District Court, Court of Criminal Appeal and High Court appeals on behalf of the Crown; and,
conduct of related proceedings in the Supreme Court and Court of Appeal.

Furthermore, under the DPP Act, the Director has similar functions with regard to:
finding a bill of indictment, or determining that no bill of indictment be found, in respect of an indictable offence, in circumstances where the person concerned has been committed for trial;
directing that no further proceeding be taken against a person who has been committed for trial or sentence; and,
finding a bill of indictment in respect of an indictable offence, in circumstances where the person concerned has not been committed for trial.

Section 21 of the DPP Act provides that the Director may appear in person or may be represented by a counsel or solicitor in any proceedings which are carried on by the Director.

The functions of the Solicitor for Public Prosecutions are prescribed in section 23 of the DPP Act. These are:
to act as solicitor for the Director in the exercise of the Director's functions; and,
to instruct the Crown Prosecutors and other counsel on behalf of the Director.

The functions of Crown Prosecutors are set out in section 5 of the Crown Prosecutors Act 1986. They include:
to conduct, and appear as counsel in, proceedings on behalf of the Director;
to find a bill of indictment in respect of an indictable offence;
to advise the Director in respect of any matter referred for advice by the Director; and,
to carry out such other functions of counsel as the Director approves.

Organisation
The ODPP consists of:
the Director, two Deputy Directors, and their legal and administrative support staff;
the Crown Prosecutors and their administrative support staff;
the Solicitor for Public Prosecutions, the solicitors, witness assistance officers, and administrative support staff employed in the Solicitor for Public Prosecution's Office; and,
the Corporate Services Division.

The Director, Deputy Directors, the Crown Prosecutors, and the Solicitor for Public Prosecutions are statutorily appointed office holders under the DPP Act.

The relationship between the Director, the Crown Prosecutors, and the Solicitor, is somewhat analogous to that which exists between client, counsel, and solicitor in the private sector. The Corporate Services Division provides financial, personnel, information technology, and property services to the other three groupings in the ODPP.

The ODPP Head Office, where the Director, the two Deputy Directors, and their support staff are based, located at 175 Liverpool Street. In Western Sydney, the ODPP has three offices, located at Parramatta, Penrith, and Campbelltown. In regional New South Wales, the ODPP has six offices, located at Lismore, Newcastle, Gosford, Wagga Wagga, Dubbo and Wollongong.

Each of the ODPP offices is staffed by Crown Prosecutors, solicitors, and administrative officers. Each office conducts prosecutions in the relevant Local, District, and Supreme Courts. Witness Assistance Service officers, who are generally social workers or psychologists, are also located in each Office. The officers of this Service provide assistance, support, referral to support agencies, and information to civilian prosecution witnesses.

See also
 Director of Public Prosecutions (Australia)
 Director of Public Prosecutions (Victoria)

References

External links

1987 establishments in Australia
Government agencies of New South Wales
New South Wales
Government agencies established in 1987